Vienna Township may refer to the following places:

 Vienna Township, Grundy County, Illinois
 Vienna Township, Scott County, Indiana
 Vienna Township, Marshall County, Iowa
 Vienna Township, Pottawatomie County, Kansas
 Vienna Township, Genesee County, Michigan (Vienna Charter Township, Michigan)
 Vienna Township, Montmorency County, Michigan
 Vienna Township, Rock County, Minnesota
 Vienna Township, Forsyth County, North Carolina
 Vienna Township, Trumbull County, Ohio

See also

Vienna (disambiguation)

Township name disambiguation pages